The Progress D-436 is a three-shaft high by-pass turbofan engine developed by the Ukrainian company Ivchenko-Progress, and manufactured by Motor Sich in Ukraine.  It was initially developed to meet the requirements for late versions of the Yakovlev Yak-42 and the Antonov An-72 in the 1980s. The engine first ran in 1985 and was subsequently certified in 1987. Several variants have been developed and are currently in service with a variety of aircraft.

Design and development

The D-436 engine was developed as a follow on to the Lotarev D-36. The engine took several of its design features from that engine and another Progress engine, the Progress D-18. The D-436 incorporated an updated, higher RPM fan, a lower emissions combustor, and new compressor sections. Several variants of the engine incorporate a FADEC.

The Motor-Sich plant in Zaporozhie, where the assembly line for D-436 engines was located, was destroyed by Russian forces in late May 2022 following the 2022 Russian invasion of Ukraine.

Variants

D-436K The "K" variant was the initial model of the engine. It had a bypass ratio of 6.2 and a pressure ratio of 21.0. Proposed for use in the defunct Antonov An-71.
D-436M The "M" variant was proposed for use on the Yak-42M.
D-436T1 The "T1" variant is used on the Tu-334 and has been offered for use on the in-development Tu-414.  See detailed specifications below.  The variant was also proposed for use on the now-defunct An-174.
D-436T1-134 The "T1-134" variant was proposed as a replacement for the engines on the Tu-134.
D-436TP The "TP" variant is a specific "maritime" corrosion-resistant version developed for use in the Be-200 amphibious aircraft. This variant produces 7,500 kgf (16,534 lbf) each.
D-436-148 The "-148" variant was developed specifically for the An-148.
D-436TX The "TX" variant uses the same core at the "T3", but includes an updated turbine and a geared fan. It is in the  class.

Derivatives
AI-436T12 This derivative engine was designed for use on the Irkut/Ilyushin MC-21. It was projected to produce  of thrust. Irkut has since replaced the AI-436T12 with the  Aviadvigatel PD-14.

Applications
Antonov An-148
Antonov An-72/74
Beriev Be-200
Tupolev Tu-334
Yakovlev Yak-42M

Specifications (D-436-T1)

See also

References

Notes

Ivchenko-Progress aircraft engines
High-bypass turbofan engines
1980s turbofan engines
Three-spool turbofan engines